Andrew Elborn Clements (May 29, 1949 – November 28, 2019) was an American author of children's literature. His debut novel Frindle won an award determined by the vote of U.S. schoolchildren in about 20 different U.S. states. In June 2015, Frindle was named the Phoenix Award winner for 2016, as it was the best book that did not win a major award when it was published.

Life
Clements was born in Camden, New Jersey, and lived in nearby Oaklyn and Cherry Hill before moving to Springfield, Illinois as a pre-teen. As a child, he enjoyed summers at a lakeside cabin in Maine where he spent his days swimming, hiking, water skiing, and his evenings reading books. After graduating with a Bachelor of Arts in English Literature from Northwestern University and a Masters of Arts in Elementary Education from National Louis University, he worked as a teacher, sharing his love of reading with elementary, middle, and high school students.

He worked for several publishing companies where he published, acquired, edited, marketed, and developed quality children's books. In 1985, Clements added his own work to the market with a picture book entitled Bird Delbert. His first novel was the award-winning Frindle, which has won 16 state book awards, as well as the Christopher Award.

Clements was married to the former Rebecca Pierpont, and they had three sons. He died at his home in Baldwin, Maine, on November 28, 2019, at age 70 from an undisclosed illness.

Awards
The Children's Literature Association named Frindle the best English-language children's book published in 1996 that did not win a major contemporary book award, thus making it the winner of the Phoenix Award for 2016.

Contemporary Awards 
 2001: Utah Children's Choice Award
 1999–2000: Pennsylvania Young Reader's Choice Award
 1999: Texas Children's Crown Award
 1999: Pacific Northwest Library Association Young Reader's Choice, (WA, OR, MT, AK, ID, AB, BC)
 1999: South Dakota Prairie Pasque Award
 1999: Sasquatch Children's Book Award, (WA)
 1999: Rebecca Caudill Young Readers Award, (IL)
 1998–1999: Maryland Black-Eyed Susan Book Award, 4–6
 1998–1999: Young Hoosier Book Award, (IN)
 1998–1999: North Carolina Children's Choice Award
 1998–1999: Nevada Young Readers' Award
 1998–1999: Charlie May Simon Children's Book Award, (AR)
 1998–1999: Maud Hart Lovelace Award, MN Youth Reading Award
 1998–1999: Georgia Children's Book Award
 1998–1999: William Allen White Children's Book Award, (KS)
 1998–1999: Massachusetts Children's Book Award
 1998: Prize Cento, Cento, Italy
 1998: Rhode Island Children's Book Award
 1997–1998: Great Stone Face Book Award, (NH)
 1997: Judy Lopez Memorial Honor Book (L.A.)Award
 1997: Christopher Award
 1998–1999 Georgia children's book award

Nominations and runners-up 
 1999–2000: Nutmeg Children's Book Award, (CT)
 1999–2000: Land of Enchantment Book Award, (NM)
 1999–2000: California Young Reader Medal
 1999–2000: Iowa Children's Choice Award
 1999: Garden State Children's Book Award, (NJ)
 1998–1999: Wyoming Indian Paintbrush Book Award
 1998–1999: Sunshine State Young Readers Award, (FL)
 1998–1999: West Virginia Children's Book Award
 1998–1999: Virginia Young Reader's Book Award
 1998–1999: Sequoyah Children's Book Award, (WA)
 1998–1999: Arizona Young Readers’ Award
 1998–1999: Texas Bluebonnet Award
 1998–1999: Nebraska Golden Sower Award
 1998: Battle of the Books Reading List, (NM)
 1998: NENE Award, (HI)
 1997–1998: Kentucky Bluegrass Award
 1997–1998: Dorothy Canfield Fisher Book Award (VT)
 1997–1998: Maine Student Book Award

Listings and recommendations 
 1999: Capitol Choices list, best books for ages 7–10
 1998: Chicago Public Library's Best of the Best
 1997–1998: Indiana Read-Alouds Too Good to Miss
 1997: Horn Book Magazine Fanfare Book
 1997: Parents' Choice Honor Book
 1996: New York Public Library One Hundred Titles for Reading and Sharing

Other
2004: California Young Readers Medal, The School Story
2004: American Library Association Schneider Family Book Award, Things Not Seen
2007: Edgar Allan Poe Award for best juvenile book, Room One: A Mystery or Two

Bibliography

For all
 (As Andrew Elborn) Noah and the Ark and the Animals, illustrated by Ivan Gantschev, Picture Book Studio (Saxonville, MA), 1987.
Santa's Secret Helper, illustrated by Deborah Santini, Picture Book Studio (Saxonville, MA), 1990.
Temple Cat, illustrated by Alan Marks, Picture Book Studio, 1991, illustrated by Kate Kiesler, Clarion (New York, NY), 1996.
Mother Earth's Counting Book, illustrated by Lonni Sue Johnson, Picture Book Studio, 1992.
Billy and the Bad Teacher, illustrated by Elivia Savadier, Picture Book Studio, 1992.
Who Owns the Cow?, illustrated by Joan Landis, Clarion (New York, NY), 1995.
Bright Christmas: An Angel Remembers, illustrated by Kate Kiesler, Clarion (New York, NY), 1996.
Frindle (middle-grade novel), illustrated by Brian Selznick, Simon & Schuster (New York, NY), 1996.
(Adapter) Philipp's Birthday Book, illustrated by Hanne Turk, North-South Books, 1996.
Riff's BeBop Book, Simon & Schuster (New York, NY), 1996.
Real Monsters Go for the Mold!, illustrated by Matthew Stoddart, Simon & Schuster (New York, NY), 1997.
Things That Go EEK on Halloween, illustrated by George Ulrich, Simon & Schuster (New York, NY), 1997.
Real Monsters Stage Fright, illustrated by Matthew Stoddart, Simon & Schuster (New York, NY), 1997.
Music Time, Any Time!, illustrated by Tom Leigh, Simon & Schuster (New York, NY), 1997.
Double Trouble in Walla Walla, illustrated by Salvatore Murdocca, Millbrook Press (Brookfield, CT), 1997.
Workshop, illustrated by David Wisniewski, Clarion (New York, NY), 1998.
Gromble's Haunted Halloween, Simon & Schuster (New York, NY), 1998.
Hey Dad, Could I Borrow Your Hammer?, illustrated by Jackie Snider, Millbrook Press (Brookfield, CT), 1999.
The Landry News, (middle-grade novel), illustrated by Salvatore Murdocca, Simon & Schuster (New York, NY), 1999.
Look Who's in the Thanksgiving Play!, illustrated by Mavis Smith, Little Simon (New York, NY), 1999.
The Mouse Family, illustrated by Simon Galkin, Little Simon (New York, NY), 2000.
The Janitor's Boy, Simon & Schuster (New York, NY), 2000.
Circus Family Dog, illustrated by Sue Truesdell, Clarion (New York, NY), 2000.
The Christmas Kitten, illustrated by Simon Galkin, Little Simon (New York, NY), 2000.
The School Story, illustrated by Brian Selznick, Simon & Schuster (New York, NY), 2001.
Things Not Seen (middle-grade novel), Philomel (New York, NY), 2002.
The Jacket (originally serialized in Boston Globe), illustrated by McDavid Henderson, Simon & Schuster (New York, NY), 2002.
A Week in the Woods, Simon & Schuster (New York, NY), 2002.
Slippers at Home, illustrated by Janie Bynum, Dutton (New York, NY), 2004.
Naptime for Slippers, illustrated by Janie Bynum, Dutton (New York, NY), 2004.
The Report Card, illustrated by Brian Selznick, Simon & Schuster (New York, NY), 2004.   
The Last Holiday Concert, Simon & Schuster (New York, NY), 2004.
Slippers at School, illustrated by Janie Bynum, Dutton (New York, NY), 2005.
Slippers Loves to Run, illustrated by Janie Bynum, Dutton (New York, NY), 2005.
A Million Is a Lot of Dots, illustrated by Rob Roth, Simon & Schuster (New York, NY), 2005.
Lunch Money, Simon & Schuster (New York, NY), 2005.
Things Hoped For, Philomel Books (New York, NY), 2006
Room One: A Mystery or Two, Simon & Schuster (New York, NY), 2006
No Talking, Simon & Schuster (New York, NY), 2007
Things That Are, Simon & Schuster (New York, NY), 2008
Lost and Found, Atheneum Books (New York, NY), 2008
Extra Credit, Simon & Schuster (New York, NY), 2009
Troublemaker, Atheneum Books (New York, NY), 2011
About Average, Atheneum Books {New York}, 2012
The Map Trap,  Atheneum Books (New York, NY), 2014
The Friendship War, Random House Books for Young Readers (New York, NY), 2019

Pets to the Rescue series
 Ringo Saves the Day!: A True Story, illustrated by Ellen Beier, Simon & Schuster (New York, NY), 2001.
 Brave Norman: A True Story, illustrated by Ellen Beier, Simon & Schuster (New York, NY), 2001.
 Tara and Tiree, Fearless Friends: A True Story, illustrated by Ellen Beier, Simon & Schuster (New York, NY), 2002.
 Delores and the Big Fire: A True Story, illustrated by Ellen Beier, Simon & Schuster (New York, NY), 2002.

Jake Drake series
 Jake Drake Know-It-All, illustrated by Dolores Avenaño, Simon & Schuster (New York, NY), 2001.
 Jake Drake, Bully Buster, illustrated by Amanda Harvey, Simon & Schuster (New York, NY), 2001.
 Jake Drake, Teacher's Pet, illustrated by Dolores Avenaño, Simon & Schuster (New York, NY), 2002.
 Jake Drake, Class Clown, illustrated by Dolores Avenaño, Simon & Schuster (New York, NY), 2002.

Benjamin Pratt and the Keepers of the School series
 We the Children, Atheneum Books (New York, NY), 2010
 Fear Itself, Atheneum Books (New York, NY), 2011
 The Whites of Their Eyes, Atheneum Books (New York, NY), 2012
 In Harm's Way, Atheneum Books (New York, NY), 2013 (with Adam Stower)
 We Hold These Truths, Atheneum Books (New York, NY), 2013

Reading program books 
 Karen's Island, Houghton Mifflin (Boston, MA), 1995.
 Three Wishes for Buster, Houghton Mifflin (Boston, MA), 1995.
 Bill Picket: An American Original, Texas Style, Houghton Mifflin (Boston, MA), 1996.
 Hurricane Andrew, Houghton Mifflin (Boston, MA), 1998.
 Ham and Eggs for Jack, Houghton Mifflin (Boston, MA), 1998.
 Life in the Desert, Steck-Vaughn, 1998.
 Desert Treasure, illustrated by Wayne Anthony Still, Steck-Vaughn, 1998.
 Inventors: Making Things Better, Steck-Vaughn, 1998.
 Milo's Great Invention, illustrated by Johnansen Newman, Steck-Vaughn, 1998.

References

External links

Andrew Clements at Fantastic Fiction

1949 births
2019 deaths
20th-century American male writers
21st-century American male writers
American children's writers
National Louis University alumni
Northwestern University alumni
People from Baldwin, Maine
People from Cherry Hill, New Jersey
People from Oaklyn, New Jersey
Writers from Camden, New Jersey
Writers from Maine
Writers from Springfield, Illinois